Owjur (also Romanized as Owjūr; also known as Lūjūr) is a village in the Central District of Sareyn County, Ardabil Province, Iran. At the 2006 census, its population was 456 in 88 families.

References 

Tageo

Towns and villages in Sareyn County